Milton, Michigan may refer to:

Milton, Macomb County, Michigan, an unincorporated community
Milton Township, Antrim County, Michigan
Milton Township, Cass County, Michigan
Milton Junction, a railroad station in Lincoln Township, Osceola County, Michigan
Milton, a copper mine in Ontonagon County, Michigan